Pictoword is a word puzzle game by Kooapps. It was released for iOS on March 1, 2013 and for Android on May 31, 2013.

Gameplay 
In Pictoword, the player will “read” two pictures to form a word. The puzzles can be a combination of the pictures (A picture of an ear and ring will form Earring), a homonym (A picture of a knight and mare will form Nightmare) or what the pictures sound like (A picture of a taxi and dough will form Tuxedo).

Coins

Coins are the main currency in the game. It can be used to buy Boosts that help you on completing levels like “Reveal 1st Photo” and buying theme packs.

Coins can be earned by completing levels, watching ads, completing daily quests and daily puzzles, and buying them in the shop.

Ask

Pictoword “Ask” feature lets you request help from your circle of friends from different social media platforms like Twitter and Instagram in solving a level that you got stuck at. The Pictoword team sometimes even gives players clues when they use this feature! 

Theme Packs

Theme Packs can be unlocked at level 25 on iOS and level 13 on Android. This feature allows players to buy special theme packs that have puzzles specialized on a certain theme like movies, superheroes, and animals.

Players need to buy these theme packs using coins. These packs range from Easy up to Extreme difficulty.

Boosts 
Boosts are features that help you complete a level. They can be used by paying coins. The following are the currently available boosts in game:

 Remove a Letter - 10 coins
 Reveal a Letter - 35 coins
 Reveal 1st Photo - 70 coins
 Reveal 2nd Photo - 70 coins
 Show Definition - 100 coins
 Skip Puzzle - 150 coins

Quests 
Quests are mini missions that you can accomplish to earn coins that you can then spend in-game. These quests are refreshed daily and there is a “Completed” section where you can check the quests you’re already done. The following are some of the sample quests available in-game:

 Play a daily puzzle
 Finish a total of 10 puzzles
 Watch a Video ad
 Use a Reveal Photo Boost
 Shop at the Coins store
 Shop at the Boosts store
 Zoom in to a Photo
 Finish 5 puzzles in a day
 Ask for help on Twitter
 Unlock a Theme Pack
 Use 5 “E” in Puzzles
 Win team bonus

Family 
Family is a feature that allows players to join communities. Players can join a family or create their own. The “Join Family” feature can be unlocked by paying 100 coins. The “Create Family” on the other hand, can be used by subscribing to a VIP membership. It is one of the said subscription’s perks.

VIP Subscription 
VIP Subscription can be unlocked by paying real-time currency. The following are the perks of becoming a VIP:

 No Ads
 500 Coins Weekly
 Free Dictionary Hint
 Create Families
 Exclusive Puzzle Packs

The subscription can be unlocked using the following payment methods:

 $1.99/Week with Free 7 Day Trial
 $4.99/Month
 $24.99/Year

VIP Subscription can be canceled anytime. With Pictoword VIP you will have unlimited access to all exciting puzzles. This subscription will automatically renew unless auto-renew is turned off at least 24 hours before the end of the current subscription period.

Theme Packs 
Pictoword comes in 14 Theme Packs, which can be unlocked by coins earned in the game.

Reception 
Pictoword received a score of 84% from Appstime, saying that "With multiple categories and difficulty levels, Pictoword makes a perfect puzzle game for all age groups by just using two images." Apps Thunder liked the concept and the user friendly interface, and gave it a 4.1/5 rating. Gnome Escape liked the various theme packs, and said that "Pictoword is one of those addicting puzzle games that make you think outside the box and see images in a new light." Get Android Stuff was less enthusiastic in their review, saying that game is quite slow and boring, but liked that the game is easy to play and is suitable for all ages.

Awards 
Pictoword won the Shining Star Award in the "Educational or Knowledge Reference App" category and the Superstar Award in the "Learning App for Kids category in the 2016 Mobile Star Awards. It also won 2016 Academic's Choice Smart Media Award.  It was also nominated at Global Mobile App Summit and Awards 2017 (GMASA). The game was nominated for "Best Educational Game" and "Best Puzzle Game" at The Independent Game Developers' Association Awards 2018. The game was also listed as one of the Therapeutic Apps for iPhone and iPad by the Flinders University, Australia. In 2019, Pictoword was a Gold Winner at Serious Play Conference Awards.

Pictoword was the recipient of the 2020 ED/IES Small Business Innovation Research grant. The Institute of Education Sciences Small Business Innovation Research program (ED/IES SBIR) funds entrepreneurial developers to create the next generation of education technology for students, teachers, and administrators in general and special education.Pictoword also won the Gold Winner awrd at Serious Play Conference Awards' "12 Serious Games Designed for Use in Grades K-12 Education" in 2022.

References 

Android (operating system) games
iOS games
Mobile games